Maleek Shoyebi (born 11 August 1987), professionally known as Maleek Berry, is a British-Nigerian record producer and recording artist. After his break into the spotlight in 2012, Maleek Berry was nominated as "Music Producer of the Year" at the 2014 Nigeria Entertainment Awards. Maleek Berry has worked with prominent artists such as Wizkid, Davido, Wale, Fuse ODG, Runtown and Iyanya. In 2017 the Starboy Label signed act was nominated in the Best Male category of the annual MOBO Awards.

Discography

Singles

As featured artist

Guest appearances

Production discography

Awards and nominations

References

External links

1987 births
Living people
People from London
Nigerian record producers
British people of Nigerian descent
British  record producers
Black British people